Tommy Frank (born 17 July 1993) is a British professional boxer who held the Commonwealth super-flyweight title from 2019 to 2020.

Early life 
Frank was born in Sheffield, Yorkshire. At the age of five, Frank had an operation to repair a hole in his heart and has since been an ambassador for Yorkshire-based national charity Heart Research UK. Frank took up boxing at the age of twelve, compiling an amateur record of 23–22, training at the Sheffield Boxing Centre in Hillsborough under the tutelage of head trainer Glyn Rhodes. After leaving school he studied plumbing at Castle College in Sheffield and worked as a labourer before turning professional.

Professional career
Frank made his professional debut on 30 July 2016, scoring a four-round points decision victory over Sergey Tasimov at the Magna Centre in Rotherham.

After compiling a record of 6–0, he challenged Craig Derbyshire for the Central Area super-flyweight title on 27 April 2018 at the iceSheffield in Yorkshire, winning by points decision over ten rounds.

Following two more wins, one by stoppage, he was scheduled to face Ross Murray on 15 March 2019 for the vacant Commonwealth super-flyweight title at the Ponds Forge Arena, Sheffield. After Murray withdrew from the bout, his new opponent was announced as Luke Wilton. Frank won the fight via fourth-round technical knockout (TKO). Frank dropped his opponent four times before the stoppage; a little over a minute into the first-round, Wilton was down from a straight right hand. After beating the referee's count of ten Frank unloaded a barrage of punches culminating in a right hook to send Wilton to the canvas for a second time. In the fourth, Frank came out from the opening bell throwing power punches. 10 seconds into the round, while backed up against the ropes, Wilton was caught with a left hook to the body to send him down for the third time. Wilton raised to his feet to beat the count yet again, but came under immediate fire from Frank, who was switching his attacks from head to body, eventually finding his target with a right hook to the midsection to send Wilton down for the fourth and final time. Referee Michael Alexander waved off the fight as Wilton made it to his feet on the count of ten.

Following a seventh-round TKO win over John Chuwa in July, he returned to the Ponds Forge Arena on 20 September 2019, facing Aran Dipaen for the vacant WBC International Silver super-flyweight title. Frank won the title by split decision. In a hard-fought, even contest, two judges' scored the bout 116–113 and 115–113 in favour of Frank, while the third scored it 115–113 to Dipaen.

Professional boxing record

References

External list

Living people
Sportspeople from Sheffield
English male boxers
Super-flyweight boxers
Commonwealth Boxing Council champions
1993 births